Apur Sansar, also known as The World of Apu, is a 1959 Indian Bengali-language drama film produced, written and directed by Satyajit Ray. It is based on the second half of Bibhutibhushan Bandopadhyay's novel Aparajito. Following Pather Panchali (1955) and Aparajito (1956), The World of Apu is the final part of Ray's The Apu Trilogy, about the childhood and early adulthood of a young Bengali named Apu in early twentieth century India. The World of Apu stars Soumitra Chatterjee (as Apu) and Sharmila Tagore (as Apu's wife Aparna); the duo would go on to appear in many subsequent Ray films.

Upon its release on 1 May 1959, The World of Apu was well-received by critics. It won the National Film Award for Best Feature Film as well as several international awards, including the Sutherland Award for Best Original And Imaginative Film and National Board of Review Award for Best Foreign Language Film.

Plot
In early 1940s, Apurba Kumar Roy (Apu) is an unemployed graduate (completed study up to the intermediate science) living in a rented room at Tala, Calcutta. Despite his teacher's advice to go for higher studies, he is unable to do so because he cannot afford it. He tries to find a job, while barely getting by providing private tutoring. His main passion is writing a novel, partially based on his own life, hoping to get it published some day. One day, he meets his old friend Pulu, who coaxes him to join him on a trip to his village in Khulna to attend the marriage of a cousin named Aparna.

On the day of the marriage, it is revealed that the bridegroom has a serious mental disorder. The bride's mother cancels the marriage, despite the father's protests. He and the other villagers believe, according to prevalent Hindu tradition, that the young bride must be wedded off during the previously appointed auspicious hour, otherwise, she will have to remain unmarried all her life. Apu, after initially refusing when requested by a few villagers, ultimately decides to take Pulu's advice and come to the rescue of the bride by agreeing to marry her. He returns with Aparna to his apartment in Calcutta after the wedding. He takes up a clerical job, and a loving relationship begins to bloom between them. Yet, the young couple's blissful days are cut short when Aparna dies while giving birth to their son, Kajal. Apu is overcome with grief and holds the child responsible for his wife's death.

He shuns his worldly responsibilities and becomes a recluse – travelling to different corners of India, while the child is left with his maternal grandparents. Meanwhile, Apu throws away his manuscript for the novel he had been writing over the years. A few years later, Pulu finds Kajal growing wild and uncared for. He then seeks out Apu, who is working at a mining quarry and advises Apu one last time to take up his fatherly responsibility. At last, Apu decides to come back to reality and reunite with his son. When he reaches his in-laws' place, Kajal, having seen him for the first time in his life, at first does not accept him as a father. Eventually, he accepts Apu as a friend and they return to Calcutta together to start life afresh.

Cast
 Soumitra Chatterjee as Apu (Apurba Kumar Roy)
 Sharmila Tagore as Aparna, Apu's wife
 Swapan Mukherjee as Pulu
 Alok Chakravarty as Kajal
 Sefalika Devi as Sasinarayan's wife
 Dhiresh Majumdar as Sasinarayan
 Dhiren Ghosh as the landlord

Production
Ray wanted fresh faces again for the film like other two films in the Apu Trilogy and thus he started auditioning. In others films he made in between, like Parash Pathar (1958) and Jalsaghar (1958), he did work with professional actors like Soumitra Chatterjee, a radio announcer and a stage actor who, with doyen of Bengali theatre Sisir Bhaduri, had first auditioned for the role of the adolescent Apu in Aparajito (1956). Though Ray thought he had the right look, he found him too old for the role. Ray remembered him and offered the role of adult Apu two years later.  Chatterjee was still unaware that he had already been selected for the title role. He had gone on the sets of Ray's fourth film, Jalsaghar, to watch the shoot. That day, while he was leaving the sets, Ray called him over and introduced him to actor Chhabi Biswas, saying, "This is Soumitra Chattopadhyay; he's playing Apu in my next film Apur Sansar", leaving him surprised. Ray however had a tough time finding an actress for the female lead Aparna. He even placed an ad in a local daily asking for photographs from girls between ages of 15 and 17. There were over a thousand responses to the ad, but Ray found none of them worth auditioning. This was when Ray became aware of a girl, Sharmila Tagore, who had recently performed at a dance recital at Children's Little Theatre (CLT) in Kolkata. She is related to poet Rabindranath Tagore, and subsequently auditioned and was selected.

Despite being selected, as a debutant actor, Chatterjee was nevertheless unsure of his career choice and especially his looks, as he did not consider himself photogenic. However, on 9 August 1958, when the first shot of the film was given an okay in one take, he realized he had found his vocation.

Awards
National Film Awards (India)
 Winner – 1959 – President's gold medal for the All India Best Feature Film

British Film Institute Awards (London Film Festival)
 Winner – 1960 – Sutherland Award for Best Original And Imaginative Film

14th Edinburgh International Film Festival
 Winner – 1960 – Diploma Of Merit

National Board of Review Awards (United States)
 Winner – 1960 – Best Foreign Film

British Academy Film Awards (United Kingdom)
 Nominated – 1962 – BAFTA Award for Best Film

Reception and legacy

At Rotten Tomatoes, The World of Apu has a 96% fresh rating based on an aggregate of 27 reviews with an average score of 9.04/10. Its critic's consensus states: "Achingly poignant, beautifully shot, and evocatively atmospheric, The World of Apu closes out Satyajit Ray's classic trilogy on a high note". In 1992, Sight & Sound (the British Film Institute's film magazine) ranked  The Apu Trilogy at #88 in its Critics' Poll list of all-time greatest films. The World of Apu appeared in 1982 Sight & Sound Poll of Greatest Films of All Time ranked at #42. In 2002, a combined list of Sight & Sound critics' and directors' poll results ranked The World of Apu at #93 in the list. In 1998, the Asian film magazine Cinemaya'''s critics' poll of all-time greatest films ranked The Apu Trilogy at #7 on the list. In 1999, The Village Voice ranked The Apu Trilogy at #54 in its Top 250 "Best Films of the Century" list, based on a poll of critics. The film was selected as the Indian entry for the Best Foreign Language Film at the 32nd Academy Awards, but was not accepted as a nominee.

In 1996, The World of Apu was included in Movieline Magazine's "100 Greatest Foreign Films". In 2001, film critic Roger Ebert included The Apu Trilogy in his list of "100 Great Movies" of all time. In 2002, The World of Apu featured in "The New York Times Guide to the Best 1,000 Movies Ever Made". In 2005, The Apu Trilogy was included in Time magazine's All-Time 100 best movies list.

In Gregory Nava's 1995 film My Family, the final scene is duplicated from the final scene of Apur Sansar. The film's influence can also be seen in famous works such as several Philip Kaufman films. References to The World of Apu are also found in several films by European filmmaker Jean-Luc Godard, and in Paul Auster's 2008 novel Man in the Dark where two characters have a discussion about the film. In 2012 the film was ranked #235 in the Sight & Sound Top 250 Films list. The film is ranked 55 in Letterboxd's list of 250 greatest films of all time.

Preservation
The Academy Film Archive preserved the entire Apu Trilogy in 1996, including Apur Sansar. In 2013, the video distribution company The Criterion Collection, in collaboration with the Academy of Motion Picture Arts and Sciences’ Film Archive, began the restoration of the original negatives of the Apu trilogy, including Apur Sansar''. These negatives had been severely damaged by a fire in London in 1993, and all film cans and fragments belonging to the Ray films were sent to the Motion Picture Academy for storage, where they lay unseen for two decades. It was discovered upon reexamination that, although many parts of the films were indeed destroyed by fire or the effects of age, other parts were salvageable. The materials were shipped to a restoration laboratory in Bologna, Italy: L'Immagine Ritrovata. For those parts of the negative that were missing or unusable, duplicate negatives and fine-grain masters from various commercial or archival sources were used. The Criterion Collection’s own lab then spent six months creating the digital version of all three films, at times choosing to preserve the distinctive look of the films even at the cost of retaining some imperfections.

See also
 Cinema of West Bengal
 Parallel Cinema
 List of submissions to the 32nd Academy Awards for Best Foreign Language Film
 List of Indian submissions for the Academy Award for Best Foreign Language Film

References

Bibliography

External links
 
 
 
 Apur Sansar at SatyajitRay.org

1959 films
1950s coming-of-age drama films
Bengali-language Indian films
Indian coming-of-age drama films
Indian black-and-white films
Best Feature Film National Film Award winners
Films set in Kolkata
Films directed by Satyajit Ray
Films with screenplays by Satyajit Ray
Films scored by Ravi Shankar
1950s Bengali-language films
1959 drama films
Films based on works by Bibhutibhushan Bandyopadhyay
Films about poverty in India